Detlef Brandes (born 1941) is a German historian who is known for his writings on the history of the Czech lands. He teaches modern history at the Heinrich Heine University Düsseldorf and heads the Institute for the History and Culture of Germans in Eastern Europe there.

References

Further reading
 Dietmar Neutatz and Volker Zimmermann (eds.): Die Deutschen und das östliche Europa. Aspekte einer vielfältigen Beziehungsgeschichte. Festschrift zum 65. Geburtstag von Prof. Dr. Dr. h.c. Detlef Brandes. Klartext Verlag, Essen 2006, .

20th-century German historians
Historians of the Czech Republic
Living people
1941 births
21st-century German male writers
20th-century German male writers
21st-century German historians
Academic staff of Heinrich Heine University Düsseldorf